Clinton is a city in Custer and Washita counties in the U.S. state of Oklahoma. The population was 9,033 at the 2010 census.

History
The community began in 1899 when two men, J.L. Avant and E.E. Blake, decided to locate a town in the Washita River Valley.

Congressional approval for the sale was granted in 1902 and Washita Junction quickly developed. The first businesses were the office of the Custer County Chronicle newspaper and the First National Bank building. When a post office was started, the postal department would not accept the name of Washita Junction; so the town was named for Judge Clinton F. Irwin.

Clinton particularly benefited from the presence of U.S. Highway 66. Like most other cities and towns on Route 66, Clinton was home of tourist businesses including several restaurants, cafés, motels and filling stations. The Pop Hicks Restaurant was once the longest running restaurant on Route 66. It opened in 1936 and closed after a fire in 1999. The U.S. Highway 66 Association, founded 1927 in Tulsa, Oklahoma, curtailed its activity when World War II rationing of rubber and fuel disrupted leisure travel. After the war, Jack and Gladys Cutberth revived the organization in Clinton, where it promoted the "Main Street of America" from 1947 until it disbanded in the 1980s. Dr. Walter S. Mason Jr. operated a Best Western motel (1964–2003) which welcomed Elvis Presley as an occasional guest in the 1960s.

Today, cross-country traffic passes Clinton to the south on Interstate 40, which bypassed the city in 1970. Clinton remains a popular tourist stop as one of the largest Route 66 cities between Oklahoma City and Amarillo, Texas. Much of the old U.S. 66 route that passed through the city is now designated as an I-40 business loop; the town became home to the first state sponsored Route 66 Museum in the nation.

In 1942, the federal government built a naval airfield at nearby Burns Flat and named it Naval Air Station Clinton. During the World War II period, the population of Clinton grew to nearly 7,000 residents. In 1949, Naval Air Station Clinton was deactivated and the airfield was deeded to the City of Clinton, specifying that the land could be recaptured in case of national emergencies. Later, the government leased the site back and used it as Clinton-Sherman Air Force Base a bomber base supporting 4123rd Strategic Wing, then the 70th Bombardment Wing, Heavy of the Strategic Air Command (SAC), operating B-52 Stratofortress and KC-135 Stratotanker aircraft. When military operations were de-emphasized, the Clinton-Sherman base was designated for closure in 1969. The entire complex was deeded to the City of Clinton in 1971 and three years later became the Clinton-Sherman Industrial Airpark.

Clinton is also home to the Clinton Daily News, a six-day daily newspaper edited by Rod Serfoss which has a circulation of 4,500. The newspaper has been published continuously from its inception in 1927 to the current day.

Geography
Clinton is located at  (35.509369, −98.974063), sitting at an elevation of 1,592 feet (485 m). The town is located on historic U.S. Route 66, which is now Interstate 40.

According to the United States Census Bureau, the city has a total area of 8.9 square miles (23.2 km2), of which 8.9 square miles (23.1 km2) is land and 0.04 square mile (0.1 km2) (0.22%) is water.

Climate

According to the Köppen Climate Classification system, Clinton has a humid subtropical climate, abbreviated "Cfa" on climate maps.

Demographics

As of the census of 2015, The population density was 989.1 people per square mile (381.9/km2). There were 3,818 housing units at an average density of 427.5 per square mile (165.1/km2). The racial makeup of the city was 52.2% White, 3.2% African American, 3.4% Native American, 2.4% Asian, 0.07% Pacific Islander, 13.62% from other races, and 5.1% from two or more races. Hispanic or Latino of any race were 34.8% of the population.

There were 3,331 households, out of which 32.6% had children under the age of 18 living with them, 51.7% were married couples living together, 11.7% had a female householder with no husband present, and 32.0% were non-families. 28.5% of all households were made up of individuals, and 14.1% had someone living alone who was 65 years of age or older. The average household size was 2.55 and the average family size was 3.14.

In the city, the population was spread out, with 27.6% under the age of 18, 8.9% from 18 to 24, 25.7% from 25 to 44, 20.5% from 45 to 64, and 17.4% who were 65 years of age or older. The median age was 36 years. For every 100 females, there were 93.0 males. For every 100 females age 18 and over, there were 88.3 males.

The median income for a household in the city was $27,051, and the median income for a family was $32,242. Males had a median income of $24,588 versus $18,596 for females. The per capita income for the city was $14,606. About 14.6% of families and 18.9% of the population were below the poverty line, including 23.9% of those under age 18 and 11.1% of those age 65 or over.

Economy
Automotive manufacturer SportChassis, a maker of customized tow rigs, has its global headquarters in Clinton.

Events
The Clinton Regional Airport was the site of the first crash of a C-5 Galaxy (68-0227) on September 27, 1974.

Notable people

 Gordon Gore, professional football player
 Captain Frederick F. Henry, United States Army (deceased), Korean War Medal of Honor recipient 
 Scott Hendricks, music producer
 Toby Keith, singer
 Earl Plumlee, War in Afghanistan Medal of Honor recipient
 Meg Randall, actress
 James R. Winchester, judge

Schools
Clinton has three elementary schools, one middle school and one high school within the public school system.  There is also an alternative school that is part of the public school system.

Sports
Clinton is known for its high school football team, the "Red Tornadoes". The Red Tornadoes have won 17 state championships (1965, 1967, 1968, 1969, 1978, 1982, 1984, 1996, 1997, 2000, 2001, 2003, 2004, 2005, 2007, 2012, 2021) which ranks currently second in the state of Oklahoma behind Ada. The Red Tornado football program currently ranks first in the state in all-time wins. Along with football, Clinton excels at a number of other sports. Other school sports include boys' and girls' basketball (the "Lady Red Tornadoes" or "Lady Reds"), baseball, girls' softball, wrestling, tennis, soccer, girls' volleyball, and track and field. Clinton's wrestling team earned its first trip to a dual state championship final in 2015; it would lose to longtime rival Tuttle Tigers. They returned to the dual state championship final in 2017 where they lost to Tuttle, again. The Lady Red Tornadoes soccer team won the State Championship in 2017 under the leadership of Coach Eugene Jefferson.

Team colors are maroon and gold and the school mascot is an anthropomorphic tornado named "Tony."

Sights

Museums
 Oklahoma Route 66 Museum is the state's official showcase of Route 66, operated by the Oklahoma Historical Society, and located on historic U.S. Route 66.  
 The Cheyenne Cultural Center was founded in hopes of preserving the Cheyenne people's way of life.   The site has become a regional interpretive center for Cheyenne history and culture.

National Register of Historic Places

 Clinton Armory
 Crawford House
 McLain Rogers Park
 Y Service Station & Café

References

External links
 City website
 Clinton Chamber of Commerce
 Community profile
 Legends of America
 Encyclopedia of Oklahoma History and Culture - Clinton
 Route 66 Museum
 Cheyenne Cultural Center

Cities in Custer County, Oklahoma
Cities in Washita County, Oklahoma
Cities in Oklahoma